Samuel Brooks (born 29 September 1993) is a Scotland international rugby league footballer who plays as a  for the Barrow Raiders in the Betfred Championship.

Background
Brooks was born in Wigan, Greater Manchester, England.

Career

Halifax RLFC
He was in the Wigan Warriors Academy system. He moved to Halifax for the 2014 season.

Rochdale Hornets
In 2015 he moved to the Rochdale Hornets, before making a mid-season switch to play for Whitehaven in the Kingstone Press Championship.

Whitehaven
He since returned to Whitehaven in the Kingstone Press Championship as a dual-registered player.

Brooks has previously played for the Widnes in the Super League.

Swinton Lions
On 12 August 2020 it was announced that Brooks had signed for the Swinton Lions for the 2021 season.

Barrow Raiders
On 18 Oct 2021 it was reported that he had signed for Barrow Raiders in the RFL Championship for 2022.

International
Brooks is a Scotland international.

References

External links

Featherstone Rovers profile
Widnes Vikings profile
Rochdale Hornets profile
2017 RLWC profile

1993 births
Living people
Barrow Raiders players
English rugby league players
English people of Scottish descent
Halifax R.L.F.C. players
Leigh Leopards players
Rochdale Hornets players
Rugby league players from Wigan
Rugby league props
Scotland national rugby league team players
Swinton Lions players
Widnes Vikings players
Whitehaven R.L.F.C. players